Industrial Bank of Iraq is an industrial bank company headquartered in Baghdad, Iraq. The main area of activity of the bank is giving loans for the industrial sector in Iraq.

It is one of four special purpose banks established after the Second Gulf War.

See also
Iraqi dinar

References
http://www.cbi.iq/index.php?pid=IraqFinancialInst&lang=en

Organizations based in Baghdad
Economy of Iraq
Banks of Iraq